Empar Félix (born 11 April 1994) is a Spanish professional racing cyclist who rides for Lointek.

See also
 List of 2016 UCI Women's Teams and riders

References

External links
 

1997 births
Living people
Spanish female cyclists
People from Safor
Sportspeople from the Province of Valencia
Cyclists from the Valencian Community